"Long Legged Woman Dressed in Black" is a popular song and hit single by the British group Mungo Jerry, first released in 1974.  It also became the title track of a compilation album by the group, released later in 1974.

Chart performance
It was written by the band's lead singer Ray Dorset and produced by Barry Murray and Dorset.  In addition to Dorset (guitar, vocals), the line-up of the group at this time which played on the record comprised Dick Middleton (guitar), Bob Daisley (bass), Ian Milne (keyboards), and Dave Bidwell (drums). The song entered the UK Singles Chart in April 1974 and reached No. 13 staying for nine weeks on the chart, their last single to reach the British Top 20. The song peaked at number 84 in Australia.

References

1974 singles
Mungo Jerry songs
Songs written by Ray Dorset
1974 songs
Dawn Records singles
Song recordings produced by Barry Murray